In  physics, sound energy is a form of energy that can be heard by living things. Only those waves that have a frequency of 20 Hz to 20 kHz are audible to humans. However, this  range is an average and will slightly change from individual to individual. Sound waves that have frequencies below 20 Hz are called infrasonic and those above 20 kHz are called ultrasonic. Sound is a mechanical wave and as such consists physically in oscillatory elastic compression and in oscillatory displacement of a fluid. Therefore, the medium acts as storage for both potential and kinetic energy.

Consequently, the sound energy in a volume of interest is defined as the sum of the potential and kinetic energy densities integrated over that volume:

where
V is the volume of interest;
p is the sound pressure;
v is the particle velocity;
ρ0 is the density of the medium without sound present;
ρ is the local density of the medium; and
c is the speed of sound. Sound energy is energy that can be heard.

See also
Sound energy density

References

Sound measurements
Forms of energy
Noise pollution